The Oskbes Aviatika MAI-920 is a Russian high-wing, cable-braced, single-seat, training glider that was designed and produced by Oskbes MAI Moskau Aviation Institut, first flying in 1992.

Design and development
The MAI-920 was developed from the powered Oskbes Aviatika MAI-890 ultralight, which can also be used to aerotow the MAI-920 glider. The MAI-920 has a 90% parts commonality with the MAI-890. The glider design uses a higher aspect ratio monoplane wing in place of the MAI-890's biplane wing. It is intended to be a simple and robust student solo glider.

The MAI-920 glider is made from aluminium tube and fabric, with the nose cone built from fibreglass. Its  span wing is cable-braced from a kingpost. The landing gear is a fixed monowheel gear, with a nose skid or caster and a tail skid.

Specifications (MAI-920)

See also

References

External links

1990s Russian sailplanes
High-wing aircraft
Aircraft first flown in 1992